The NC State–Wake Forest rivalry is a series of athletic contests between in-state rivals, the North Carolina State University Wolfpack and the Wake Forest University Demon Deacons. The first game was played in 1895 between the two institutions. Wake Forest was originally located in Wake Forest, North Carolina (approximately 18 miles NNE of NCSU's campus in Raleigh) until it moved its campus across the state of North Carolina to Winston-Salem, North Carolina in 1956. The two universities are members of the Atlantic Coast Conference, where they meet every year in football due to being aligned in the Atlantic Division. The schools play each other twice in basketball every season, due to being primary partners.

Football

The NC State–Wake Forest football rivalry is an American college football rivalry between the NC State Wolfpack football team of North Carolina State University and the Wake Forest Demon Deacons football team of Wake Forest University. Playing consecutively every year since 1910, it is the longest continuous rivalry between 2 ACC schools, and is the second longest streak in the nation (tied with Oklahoma vs Oklahoma State) after the Clemson/South Carolina game, the former second oldest, were canceled in 2020. Both universities are members of the Atlantic Coast Conference (ACC) and are members of the Atlantic Division. There have been 116 meetings between the two teams, with NC State leading the all-time series 68–42–6. NC State won the most recent contest between the two schools on November 5, 2022 in Raleigh, North Carolina by the score of 30–21.

Game results

Men's basketball 

NC State currently leads the series 150–108.

The rivalry dates back to when Wake Forest was in Wake Forest, NC, and was only a short distance from NC State's campus in Raleigh. Their rivalry eventually expanded into the Big Four with UNC-Chapel Hill and Duke, which are recognized as being some of the fiercest rivalries in NCAA men's basketball. The two teams met twice during the 2022–23 ACC regular season, with NC State winning both contests.

Game results

See also 
 List of NCAA college football rivalry games
 List of most-played college football series in NCAA Division I

References

NC State Wolfpack
Wake Forest Demon Deacons
College football rivalries in the United States
College basketball rivalries in the United States
College soccer rivalries in the United States
College sports in North Carolina